is a Japanese rugby union player born in New Zealand who plays as a lock. He currently plays for Toshiba Brave Lupus Tokyo in Japan's domestic Japan Rugby League One.

International
Dearns was called for his country on 28 October 2021 for the 2021 end-of-year rugby union internationals. He made his debut on 13 November in the match against Portugal.

References

External links 
 

2002 births
Living people
People from Wellington City
Rugby union players from Wellington City
Sportspeople from Wellington City
Japanese rugby union players
Rugby union locks
Toshiba Brave Lupus Tokyo players